Wanmai Setthanan, (born 12 January 1986) is a Thai professional footballer who plays as a right-back.

Honour 
 Lamphun Warriors
 Thai League 2 (1): 2021–22

References

External links
  at Soccerway

1986 births
Living people
Wanmai Setthanan
Association football defenders
Wanmai Setthanan
Wanmai Setthanan
Wanmai Setthanan
Wanmai Setthanan